Aswang is a mythical shapeshifting monster in Philippine folklore.

Aswang may also refer to:

 Aswang (1992 film); see List of Philippine films of the 1990s
 Aswang (1994 film), a horror film based on the mythical creature
 Aswang (2011 film), another film based on the mythical creature

See also
 Aswan (disambiguation)